Tarzanetto is the title character of an Italian comic series created by Antonio Terenghi.

Background 
A parody of Tarzan, Tarzanetto was created by Terenghi in 1954, with his stories published in the comics magazine Chicchirichì. A young, bald boy with cigar and bowler hat, Tarzanetto became soon the most popular character of the magazine, as to make the magazine renamed Chicchirichì presenta Tarzanetto. In 1959 the magazine was eventually renamed Tarzanetto until 1961.

After a long hiatus, in  1974 Terenghi reprised the character with new stories published in Corriere dei Piccoli. Following the audience's new interest for the character, in 1975 the comic book Tarzanetto back on newsstands, published by Edinational and, from 1979 until the definitive end of publications in 1980, by Edizioni Bianconi.

References 

Italian comics titles
Italian comics characters
Child characters in comics
Male characters in comics
1954 comics debuts
1980 comics endings
Italian comics
Jungle (genre) comics
Jungle men
Fictional feral children